Ramiro "Ram" Herrera is a Tejano musician. He was nominated at the Latin Grammy Awards of 2002 in the category Latin Grammy Award for Best Tejano Album for the 2001 album Ingrata, and nominated again for Ram Herrera and the Outlaw Band at the 50th Annual Grammy Awards 2007. At the 1999 Tejano Music Awards, Herrera received a Lifetime Achievement Award.

References

Living people
Year of birth missing (living people)
Tejano musicians